Paddy the Next Best Thing (also written as Paddy-The-Next-Best-Thing) is a 1908 romantic comedy novel by the British writer Gertrude Page.

The heroine of the story is Paddy Adair, the daughter of an impoverished Irish landowner near Carlingford. Her father, General Adair, had hoped she would be a boy, but is delighted by the high-spirited Paddy who dubs herself as "the next best thing" to a boy. Paddy falls in love with another landowner, who had once been involved with her elder sister.

Adaptations
Gayer Mackay and Robert Ord adapted the novel into a successful 1920 West End play of the same title. The cast was:
General Adair – J. H. Barnes
Dr Davy Adair – Clive Currie
Eileen Adair – Betty Faire
Mary O'Hara – Margaret Nicholls
Jack O'Hara – Anew McMaster
Laurence Blake – Ion Swinley
Doreen Blake – Eithne McChee
Gwendoline Carew – Winifred Evans
Lord Sellahy – H. V. Tollemache
Micky – Hyland T. O'Shea     
Webb – Ethel Callanan
Mrs Bingley – Christine Jensen
Mrs Putter – Rose Edouin
Paddy – Peggy O'Neill.
The play opened at the Savoy Theatre on 5 April 1920, transferred briefly to the Strand Theatre in February 1922, and moved back to the Savoy in March, completing its run of 867 performances on 22 April 1922.

The novel has been made into films on two occasions: a 1923 British silent film directed by Herbert Wilcox and starring Mae Marsh and a 1933 American sound film directed by Harry Lachman and starring Janet Gaynor

References

Sources
 Block, Andrew. Key Books of British Authors, 1600-1932. D. Archer, 1933.
 Goble, Alan. The Complete Index to Literary Sources in Film. Walter de Gruyter, 1999.

1908 British novels
Novels by Gertrude Page
British romance novels
British novels adapted into films
Novels set in Ireland
Hurst and Blackett books